The Canadian province of New Brunswick first required its residents to register their motor vehicles in 1905. Registrants provided their own licence plates for display until 1911, when the province began to issue plates.

, plates are issued by the New Brunswick Department of Justice and Public Safety through its Motor Vehicle Branch. Only rear plates have been required on all vehicles since July 15, 2019.

Passenger baseplates

1911 to 1961
The first New Brunswick licence plate that complied with these standards was issued seven years beforehand, in 1949 (dated 1950).

1962 to present

Commercial baseplates

Truck plates

Prorated plates

Farm plates

Taxi plates

Other non-passenger baseplates

Antique vehicle plates
License plates designated for Historic cars.

Trailer plates

Motorcycle plates

ATV plates

Dealer plates

Seasonal plates

Firefighter plates

Specialty Plates
The first Conservation license plate featured a Salmon design. In 2009, New Brunswick introduced three new specialty license plate designs; Chickadee, Flower & Deer. The money earned from these plates go to the New Brunswick Wildlife Trust Fund.

References

External links
New Brunswick licence plates, 1969–present

1905 establishments in New Brunswick
New Brunswick
Transport in New Brunswick
New Brunswick-related lists